The 2022–23 Yale Bulldogs men's basketball team represented Yale University in the 2022–23 NCAA Division I men's basketball season. The Bulldogs, led by 23rd-year head coach James Jones, played their home games at John J. Lee Amphitheater in New Haven, Connecticut as members of the Ivy League. They finished the season 20–7, 10–4 to finish in a tie for 1st place. In the Ivy Tournament, they defeated Cornell in the semifinals before losing to Princeton in the Ivy Championship title. They received an automatic bid to the NIT, losing to Vanderbilt in the first round.

Previous season
The Bulldogs finished the 2021–22 season 19–12, 11–3 in Ivy League play to finish in second place. They defeated Penn and Princeton to win the Ivy League Tournament and earn the conference's automatic bid into the 2022 NCAA Tournament. They received the #14 seed in the East Region and drew #3 seed Purdue in the First Round. They would go on to lose to the Boilermakers, 56–78.

Roster

Schedule and results

|-
!colspan=12 style=| Non-conference regular season

|-
!colspan=12 style=| Ivy League regular season

|-
!colspan=12 style=| Ivy League Tournament

|-
!colspan=9 style=| <span
style=
>NIT</span> 

Sources

References

Yale Bulldogs men's basketball seasons
Yale
Yale Bulldogs men's basketball
Yale Bulldogs men's basketball
Yale